The Washington Homeschool Organization (WHO) is a homeschool group located in the state of Washington, USA. WHO is a non-profit organization with a bimonthly newsletter detailing local homeschooling news. Its mission is to serve the diverse interests of home-based education in Washington State. WHO is nonpartisan, nonsectarian, and nondiscriminating in its views of homeschooling and participation in its activities. WHO hosts an annual homeschool convention at the Washington State Fairgrounds in Puyallup, Washington, featuring the largest curriculum exhibit in the Pacific Northwest. WHO also hosts an annual high school graduation ceremony for homeschoolers.

External links
Washington Homeschool Organization

Alternative education
Homeschooling in the United States